Charlotte Atkinson may refer to:

 Charlotte Barton (1797–1867), married name Atkinson, author of Australia's earliest known children's book
 Charlotte Atkinson (swimmer) (born 1996), British swimmer